The winners of the 1992 AFC U-16 Championship, organised by the Asian Football Confederation (AFC) and held once every two years for Asian under-16 teams that also serves as a qualification tournament for the FIFA U-17 World Cup, are listed below.

Qualification

Qualified teams:
 (host)
 (Group 1 winner)
 (Group 2 winner)
 (Group 2 runner-up)
 (Group 3 winner)
 (Group 4 winner)
 (Group 4 runner-up)
 (Group 5 winner)

Group stage

Group A

Group B

Knockout stage

Semifinals

Third-place match

Final

Winners

Tournament ranking

Teams qualified for 1993 FIFA U-17 World Championship

 (host)

Sources
rsssf.com

 
Under
International association football competitions hosted by Saudi Arabia
1992 in youth association football
AFC U-17 Championships